Koybagar is a lake in the Kostanay Region, Kazakhstan.

Koybagar is a steppe lake of the central sector of the Turgay Basin in Karasu District, Kostanay Region. The lake is part of the Koibagar-Tyuntyugur Lake System, a Ramsar site, since 2009.

Geography
It is located between the larger Kushmurun lake to the west and the smaller Tyuntyugur to the east. The lake stretches roughly from north to south. The Karasu river flows into the western shore of the lake.

Usually during the dry season in the summer the lake shrinks, the northern part dries up and the water of the southern part turns brackish. The lakeshore is largely slightly sloping and low-lying.

Fauna
The lake is part of the Koybagar-Tyuntyugur lake group. It is a critical site for waterbirds such as the lesser white-fronted goose, red-breasted goose, glaucous gull and the critically endangered siberian crane. 
There are ten different fish species in the lake, including perch and pike.

See also
List of lakes of Kazakhstan
List of Ramsar Wetlands of International Importance

References

External links
Saryarka – Steppe Lakes of Northern Kazakhstan

Lakes of Kazakhstan
Kostanay Region
Endorheic lakes of Asia